The Three from the Filling Station (German: Die Drei von der Tankstelle) may refer to:

 The Three from the Filling Station (1930 film), directed by Wilhelm Thiele and starring Lilian Harvey
 The Three from the Filling Station (1955 film), directed by Hans Wolff 
 The Three from the Filling Station (play), a play based on the films

See also
 Le chemin du paradis, the French language version of the 1930 film, also starring Harvey